Artland is a Samtgemeinde ("collective municipality") in the district of Osnabrück, in Lower Saxony, Germany. It is situated along the river Hase, approx. 45 km north of Osnabrück, and 25 km west of Vechta. Its seat is the town Quakenbrück.

The Samtgemeinde Artland consists of the following municipalities:

 Badbergen
 Menslage
 Nortrup
 Quakenbrück

References